Andrew Marveggio (born 22 April 1992) is an Australian footballer who plays as a defensive midfielder for OFK Petrovac in the Montenegrin First League. Besides Australia, he has played in the Netherlands, Germany, and Serbia.

Club career

Telstar
Marveggio made his debut for Telstar in the Eerste Divisie on 10 March 2012 against Go Ahead Eagles.

Fortuna Sittard
After three seasons at Telstar, in July 2014 it was announced Marveggio had signed a one-year deal with Fortuna Sittard.

FC Strausberg

At the start of 2016 Marveggio moved into German football, joining struggling FC Strausberg during the Oberliga's winter break and scoring 2 goals in 11 appearances during the remainder of the season.

VfV 06 Hildesheim

In the summer of 2016 Marveggio moved up a division by accompanying departing Strausberg-coach Mario Block to Regionalliga Nord club VfV Hildesheim, signing a contract for the 2016–2017 season. He made his Regionalliga Nord debut in the league opening round, as a defender in the starting line up against VfB Lübeck. He finished his first Regionalliga season having played in 31 out of 34 league games, and having appeared 30 times in the starting line up.

Mačva Šabac
Marveggio debuted in the Serbian SuperLiga on 6 October 2018, as substitute in the game against OFK Bačka.

References

External links
 Player profile at VfV 06 Hildesheim 

1992 births
Living people
Soccer players from Adelaide
Australian people of Italian descent
Association football midfielders
Australian soccer players
Adelaide City FC players
SC Telstar players
Fortuna Sittard players
VfV 06 Hildesheim players
FK Zemun players
FK Mačva Šabac players
FK Bokelj players
OFK Petrovac players
FFSA Super League players
Eerste Divisie players
Regionalliga players
Serbian SuperLiga players
Montenegrin Second League players
Australian expatriate soccer players
Expatriate footballers in the Netherlands
Australian expatriate sportspeople in the Netherlands
Expatriate footballers in Germany
Australian expatriate sportspeople in Germany
Expatriate footballers in Serbia
Australian expatriate sportspeople in Serbia
Expatriate footballers in Montenegro